At the 2009 National Games of China, the athletics events were held at the Jinan Olympic Sports Center in Jinan, People's Republic of China from 21–26 October, 2009. The National Games marathon event was held in conjunction with the Beijing Marathon on 18 October.

Medal summary

Men

Women

Medal table

References
General
National Games Athletics event results. Tilastopaja Oy. Retrieved on 2009-10-25.
Jalava, Mirko (2009-10-21). 19-year-old wins men’s 10,000m, as National Games open in China. IAAF. Retrieved on 2009-10-24.
Jalava, Mirko (2009-10-22). Gong Lijiao puts 20.35m to highlight the first day of Chinese National Games. IAAF. Retrieved on 2009-10-24.
Jalava, Mirko (2009-10-23). World leading 66.40m Discus heave by Li Yanfeng in Jinan – Chinese National Games, day 2. IAAF. Retrieved on 2009-10-24.
Jalava, Mirko (2009-10-24). 16-year-old wins women’s long jump in Jinan – Chinese National Games, day 3. IAAF. Retrieved on 2009-10-24.
Jalava, Mirko (2009-10-25). Liu Xiang begins campaign; Li Shaojie bags fourth gold - Chinese National Games, Day 4. IAAF. Retrieved on 2009-10-26.

Specific

External links
Athletics at official website 

2009 National Games of China
2009
Chinese Games